The Oldsmobile Limited was a top-level passenger car produced by GM's Oldsmobile Division in 1910, offered as an upgraded replacement to the Oldsmobile Model Z when it was discontinued in 1909. The Oldsmobile Limited was very large and expensive in comparison to vehicles offered by competitors, and was manufactured in Lansing, Michigan. It was the senior model to the mid-level Oldsmobile Autocrat of which it shared much of its technology while the Autocrat was smaller, and was replaced by the Oldsmobile Light Eight. It was also much larger than GM's lop level brand, the Cadillac Model Thirty which only had a four cylinder engine, and the Buick Model 10 which made the Limited the most expensive vehicle GM offered at the time.

History

The Series 23 was equipped with an enormous six-cylinder T-head engine that displaced  developing 60 bhp. The engine was installed in the front, driving the rear wheels through a transmission shaft. The gearbox had four forward gears, with the gearshift lever and handbrake positioned externally and to the right of the driver, who sat on the right hand side of the vehicle. Retail prices ranged from US$4,600 ($ in  dollars ) to US$5,800 ($ in  dollars ) for the closed body sedan which made it a competitor with the Pierce-Arrow Town Car. As with other Oldsmobiles of the time, the brake pedal came into contact with the Drum brake on the rear wheels.

It was used in a race against the 20th Century Limited train from Albany to New York City and a painting was created depicting the race, with the car winning the race.

More than 800 vehicles were produced between 1910 and 1912. The car was positioned as a competitor to many large European luxury marques such as Lorraine-Dietrich, Brasier, Delaunay-Belleville, Panhard & Levassor, Mercedes-Benz, Rolls-Royce, Renault, and D. Napier & Son. Sales were affected by the fact that Oldsmobile also built the relatively tiny Oldsmobile Curved Dash.

References

Limited
1910s cars

Brass Era vehicles